Seth Franklin Berkley (born October 18, 1956) is an American medical epidemiologist, the CEO of Gavi, the Vaccine Alliance and a global advocate of the power of vaccines. He is the founder and former president and CEO of the International AIDS Vaccine Initiative (IAVI).

Early life and education
Berkley was born in New York City.

In 1974, Berkley graduation from McBurney School, a private school in New York City. In 1978, he received a ScB from Brown University. In 1981, he received a M.D. from Brown University's Alpert Medical School. Berkley then trained in internal medicine at Harvard University.

Career
From 1984 to 1986, Berkley worked as a medical epidemiologist for the Center for Infectious Diseases of the U.S. Centers for Disease Control and Prevention (CDC) in Atlanta, GA. While working for the CDC, Berkley was involved in, among other things, managing the national Toxic Shock Syndrome surveillance system. He also conducted an investigation of an outbreak of Brazilian Purpuric Fever, a disease that was killing children in Brazil, and helped to discover the etiologic agent. In 1986, on assignment from the CDC, Berkley served as an epidemiologist for the Massachusetts Department of Public Health, working on routine surveillance and outbreak investigations.

A year later, while working for the Carter Presidential Center in Atlanta, Berkley was assigned as an epidemiologist at the Ministry of Health in Uganda. In this role, he worked to establish and manage the Ugandan surveillance system for AIDS, validate the AIDS clinical case definition for Africa and assist with the conduct and analysis of the national HIV sero-survey. Berkley played a role in helping to develop Uganda's National AIDS Control programs, and served as an attending internal medicine physician at Mulago Hospital in Kampala.

Subsequently, Berkley worked for the Rockefeller Foundation, initially as program scientist and finally as associate director of the Health Sciences Division. During his eight years with the Rockefeller Foundation, Berkley managed programs in epidemiology, public health, medical and nursing education, vaccination, AIDS and sexually transmitted diseases and reproductive health in Africa, Asia, and Latin America. Some of his initiatives included developing a public health training program, Public Health School without Walls, which began in Zimbabwe, Ghana, Uganda, and then spread to Vietnam, as well as an international program to support non-governmental organizations working on AIDS, the International HIV/AIDS Alliance. He also represented the Rockefeller Foundation during meetings of the United Nations' Children's Vaccine Initiative, which was later replaced by Gavi, the Vaccine Alliance.

Berkley has appeared on the cover of Newsweek and recognized by Wired  as among "The Wired 25"—a salute to dreamers, inventors, mavericks and leaders—as well as by Time magazine as one of the "100 Most Influential People in the World" in 2009. In 2010, Fortune magazine named Berkley as one of its "Global Forum Visionaries."

Gavi, the Vaccine Alliance
Berkley joined Gavi, the Vaccine Alliance as its chief executive officer (CEO) in August 2011. Gavi is a public-private partnership whose mission is to save children's lives and protect people's health by increasing access to immunisation in developing countries.

Since its launch in 2000, Gavi has prevented more than fifteen million future deaths and helped protect 981 million children with new and underused vaccines. Gavi brings together developing country and donor governments, the World Health Organization, UNICEF, the World Bank, the vaccine industry in both industrialised and developing countries, research and technical agencies, civil society organizations, the Bill & Melinda Gates Foundation and other private philanthropists.

Berkley and Coalition for Epidemic Preparedness Innovations (CEPI) CEO Dr. Richard Hatchett were involved in founding COVAX, the global COVID-19 pandemic vaccine initiative, following a meeting at the World Economic Forum in Davos. COVAX is directed by Gavi, the Coalition for Epidemic Preparedness Innovations (CEPI), the World Health Organization (WHO) and UNICEF.

The IAVI Years 
In 1994, the Rockefeller Foundation, where Berkley was serving as associate director of health sciences, convened a series of international consensus meetings on the need for a new effort to address existing barriers to the development of an AIDS vaccine and jump-start AIDS vaccine research. These meetings, culminating in a conference in Bellagio, Italy, became the impetus for the establishment of IAVI in 1996 as an international NGO tasked with aggressively pursuing previously neglected approaches to AIDS vaccine development. Berkley was appointed interim president and later became CEO.

Under Berkley's leadership, the organization evolved into a worldwide public-private product development partnership with a staff of more than 200 employees that has worked with partners in 25 countries and, with partners, conducted 24 HIV vaccine trials.

Selected professional affiliations
Berkley has sat on a number of international steering committees and corporate and not-for-profit boards, including those of Gilead Sciences, the New York Academy of Sciences, the Acumen Fund, the Council of Foreign Relations, the Scientific Advisory Panel assisting the UNAIDS High Level Commission on HIV Prevention, Oxfam America, the Guttmacher Institute, VillageReach, VaxInnate, PowderJect, Napo pharmaceuticals and the US National Academy of Medicine.

 Fellow, American College of Physicians
 Fellow, Council on Foreign Relations
 Fellow, Infectious Diseases Society of America
 Fellow, Massachusetts Medical Society
 Founding Member, The Network of AIDS Researchers of Eastern and Southern Africa

Academic Appointments
 Adjunct Professor, Brown University School of Medicine
 Adjunct Professor, Columbia University Mailman School of Public Health
 Adjunct Professor, New York University School of Medicine

Selected awards
 2013, Nelson Mandela Metropolitan University, honorary doctorate

Selected works and publications

Books

Articles
 Berkley SF, Hightower AH, Broome CV, Reingold AL. The relationship of tampon characteristics to menstrual toxic shock syndrome. JAMA 1987; 258:917-920.
 The Brazilian Purpuric Fever Study Group (report written by Fleming DW and Berkley SF).  Brazilian Purpuric Fever: Epidemic purpura fulminans associated with antecedent purulent conjunctivitis. Lancet 1987; 8562:757-761.
 The Brazilian Purpuric Fever Study Group (report written by Berkley SF and Harrison L).  Haemophilus aegyptius bacteremia in Brazilian Purpuric Fever. Lancet 1987;8562:761-763.
 Berkley SF, Widy-Wirski R, Okware SI, Downing R, Linnan MJ, White KE, Sempala S. Risk factors associated with HIV infection in Uganda.  J Infec Dis 1989; 160:22-30.
 Berkley SF, Naamara W, Okware SI, Downing R, Konde-lule J, Wawer M, Musagaara M, Musgrave S.  AIDS and HIV Infection in women in Uganda—are women more infected than males.  AIDS 1990;  4:1237-1242.
 Heeler C, Berkley SF.  Initial lessons from emerging public-private partnerships in drug and vaccine development.  Bulletin of the World Health Organization 2001, 79:728-734.
 Klausner RD, Fauci AS, Corey L, Nabel GJ, Gayle H, Berkley S, et al.  The Need for a Global HIV Vaccine Enterprise.  Science, Jun 27 2003: 2036–2039.
 Berkley SF.  Thorny issues in the ethics of AIDS vaccine trials.  The Lancet, 2003; 362: 992.
 Berkley SF.  Ending an Epidemic: The International AIDS Vaccine Initiative pioneers a public-private partnership.  Innovations, 2006; 1:52-66.

See also
 GAVI Alliance
 International AIDS Vaccine Initiative
 HIV vaccine

References

Further reading
 "Where Is The HIV Vaccine?", New York Times, July 2010
 "The Renaissance in HIV Vaccine Development – Future Directions", New England Journal of Medicine, July 2010
 "HIV and flu - the vaccine strategy." Q&A with Seth Berkley on TED.com
 "Have Faith in an AIDS Vaccine", New York Times, October 2009
 Seth Berkley on Huffington Post
 "A Shot at Stopping AIDS", Washington Post, December 2007
 "Seth Berkley: A Warrior in the AIDS Battle", BusinessWeek, November 2004
 "15 Minutes with Seth Berkley", Stanford Social Innovation Review, Winter 2004
 HIV and flu — the vaccine strategy (TED2010)
 Charlie Rose Interview – July 24, 2007
 Charlie Rose Interview – August 7, 2006
 The Hunt for an AIDS Vaccine, 2010 Aspen Ideas Festival
 Video: Toward a World Without AIDS

External links

 Dr. Seth Berkley at GAVI
 
 

1956 births
Living people
Alpert Medical School alumni
American epidemiologists
Harvard Medical School alumni
HIV/AIDS researchers
American health care chief executives
McBurney School alumni
Brown University alumni